Kakianako Nariki (born December 28, 1982) is an I-Kiribati athlete specializing in the 100 metres.

Participating in the 2004 Summer Olympics, he achieved seventh place in his 100 metres heat, thus failing to make it through to the second round.

Early life
Kakianako Nariki was born December 28, 1982, in Marakei, Kiribati.

Career
Nariki participated in the 2003 South Pacific Games.

Olympic career
Nariki participated in Kiribati's first Olympics, the 2004 Summer Olympics, with two other I-Kiribati athletes.

References

External links
 

1982 births
Living people
I-Kiribati male sprinters
Athletes (track and field) at the 2004 Summer Olympics
Olympic athletes of Kiribati